The Kentucky Hotel is a historic hotel building located at Lynchburg, Virginia.  It is one of Lynchburg's three remaining early 19th century ordinaries.  It was probably built before 1800, and is a -story structure of brick laid in Flemish bond. In about 1814, two side bays were completed, converting the house to a center hall plan.

It was listed on the National Register of Historic Places in 1986. and is located in the Fifth Street Historic District.

References

External links

Kentucky Hotel, Fifth & Jackson Streets, Lynchburg, VA: 1 photos, 1 data page, and 1 photo caption page, at Historic American Buildings Survey

Historic American Buildings Survey in Virginia
Hotel buildings on the National Register of Historic Places in Virginia
Federal architecture in Virginia
Buildings and structures in Lynchburg, Virginia
National Register of Historic Places in Lynchburg, Virginia
Individually listed contributing properties to historic districts on the National Register in Virginia